Ordelafo Faliero de Doni (or Dodoni) (died 1117 in Zadar, Kingdom of Hungary) was the 34th Doge of Venice.

Biography 
He was the son of the 32nd Doge, Vitale Faliero de' Doni. He was a member of the Minor Council (minor consiglio), an assembly formed from members of the so-called "apostolic families" that, in oligarchical Venice, assumed the governmental functions of judges, military councilmen, ambassadors and heads of state.

His first name, which is otherwise unknown in Venetian history, is thought to have been derived from a backwards spelling of the Venetian name "Faledro", or from the Ordelaffi family, of which the Faliero family is thought to be a stirpe.

During his reign as Doge, Faliero went to war against the Croats and Hungarians, ruled at the time by Coloman, which lasted from 1105 to 1115. Faliero succeeded in recapturing Zadar and Šibenik.

Afterwards, Faliero was engaged in an expedition to Syria, comprising 100 Venetian ships, which succeeded in conquering a part of Acre. Objects from the local Syrian convent of Christ Pantocrator were taken back to Saint Mark's Basilica.

In Venice, Faliero established the nucleus of what would become the Arsenal.

He was married to Matelda, traditionally portrayed as an ideal of spousal fidelity.

He was killed at Zadar during a battle against the Croats and Hungarians.

See also
Pala d'Oro

References
 

11th-century births
1117 deaths
Republic of Venice military personnel killed in action
12th-century Doges of Venice